White patch may refer to:

 White Patch, Queensland, an Australian locality
 Chiomara asychis, a butterfly
 Nautilus stenomphalus, the white-patch nautilus

See also
 Vitiligo